Forstau is a municipality in the St. Johann im Pongau district in the Austrian state of Salzburg.

Geography 
Forstau lies in the high valley between Radstadt and Schladming.

References 

Cities and towns in St. Johann im Pongau District